The 1975 Wisconsin Badgers football team represented the University of Wisconsin–Madison in the 1975 Big Ten Conference football season.

Schedule

Game summaries

Northwestern

    
    
    
    
    

Billy Marek became the 30th player in NCAA history to rush for over 3,000 yards in a career.

Roster

1976 NFL Draft

References

Wisconsin
Wisconsin Badgers football seasons
Wisconsin Badgers football